You and Me and the Mountain is an EP by Maps & Atlases, released in 2008 on the Sargent House label.

Track listing

References

Maps & Atlases albums
2008 EPs